Pselaphidomyces is a genus of fungi in the family Laboulbeniaceae. A monotypic genus, it contains the single species Pselaphidomyces pselapti.

References

External links 

 Pselaphidomyces at Index Fungorum

Laboulbeniomycetes
Monotypic Laboulbeniomycetes genera